Takht-e Soleyman District is in Takab County, West Azerbaijan province, Iran. At the 2006 National Census, its population was 22,996 in 4,577 households. The following census in 2011 counted 21,558 people in 5,277 households. At the latest census in 2016, the district had 20,097 inhabitants in 5,929 households. The district is the site of the Takht-e Soleyman ("Throne of Solomon") World Heritage Site.

References 

Takab County

Districts of West Azerbaijan Province

Populated places in West Azerbaijan Province

Populated places in Takab County